This is a calendar of name days in France.

January
 Ian
 Basile
 Geneviève
 Odlion
 Edouard
 Melaine
 Raymond
 Lucien
 Berlice
 Alix
 Guillaume
 Paulin
 Tatiana
 Yvette
 Nina
 Remi / Cherie
 Marcel
 Roseline
 Prisca
 Marius
 Sébastien
 Agnès
 Vincent
 Barnard
 François de Sales
 Conv. St. Paul
 Paule
 Angèle
 Thomas d'Aquin
 Gildas
 Martine
 Marcelle

February
 Ella
 Présentation du Seigneur
 Blaise
 Véronique
 Agathe
 Gaston
 Eugénie
 Jacqueline
 Apolline
 Arnaud
 N.-D. de Lourdes
 Félix
 Béatrice
 Valentin
 Claude
 Julienne
 Alexis
 Bernadette
 Gabin
 Amy, Amélie 
 Pierre Damien
 Isabelle
 Lazare
 Modeste
 Roméo
 Nestor
 Kristie
 Honorine
 Millie

March
 Aubin
 Charles le Bon
 Guénolé
 Casimir
 Olive
 Colette
 Félicité
 Jean de Dieu
 Françoise
 Vivien
 Rosine
 Justine 
 Rodrigue
 Mathilde
 Louise
 Bénédicte
 Patrice
 Cyrille
 Joseph
 Herbert
 Clémence
 Léa
 Victorien
 Catherine de Suède
 Annonciation
 Larissa
 Habib
 Gontran
 Gladys
 Amédée
 Benjamin

April
 Hugues
 Sandrine
 James
 Isidore
 Irène
 Marceline
 J.-B. de la Salle
 Julie
 Gauthier / Rameaux
 Fulbert
 Stanislas
 Jules
 Ida
 Maxime
 Paterne 
 Benoît-Joseph
 Anicet
 Marie
 Emma
 Odette
 Anselme
 Alexander
 Georges
 Fidèle
 Marc
 Alida
 Zita
 Jazzy
 Catherine de Sienne
 Robert

May
 Josh
 Boris
 Jacques / Phillipe
 Sylvain
 Judith
 Prudence
 Gisèle
 Walter
 Pacôme
 Solange
 Estelle
 Achille
 Scarlett
 Matthias
 Denise
 Honoré
 Pascal
 Eric
 Yves
 Bernardin
 Constantin
 Karla
 Didier
 Donatien
 Sophie
 Bérenger
 Augustin
 Germain
 Aymar
 Ferdinand
 Visitation

June
 Justin
 Blandine
 Tiffany
 Clotilde
 Igor
 Norbert
 Gilbert
 Médard
 Diane
 Landry
 Barnabé
 Guy
 Antoine
 Elisée
 Germaine
 J.-Fr. Régis
 Hervé
 Léonce
 Romuald
 Silvère
 Rodolphe
 Alban
 Audrey
 Jean-Baptiste
 Prosper
 Anthelme
 Fernand
 Irénée
 Pierre / Paul
 Martial

July
 Andrew
 Martinien
 Thomas
 Florent
 Esmée 
 Alice 
 Mariettas
 Raoul
 Thibaut
 Amandine
 Ulrich
 Benoît
 Olivier
 Henri / Joël / Camille
 
 Donald
 N.-D. du Mt Carmel
 Charlotte
 Frédéric
 Arsène
 Marina
 Victor
 Marie-Madeleine
 Brigitte
 Christine
 Jacques le M.
 Anne / Joachim
 Nathalie
 Samson
 Marthe
 Juliette
 Ignace de Loyola

August
 Alphonse
 Julien
 Lydie
 J.-M. Vianney
 Abel
 Transfiguration
 Sophia 
 Roisin 
 Amour 
 Laurent
 Gacrom
 Clarej
 Claire 
 Clarisse
 Marie
 Armel
 Hyacinthe
 Hélène
 Jean Eudes
 Bernard
 Christophe
 Fabrice
 Rose
 Desmond
 Louis
 Natacha
 Monique
 Sophia
 Aristide

September
 Gilles
 Ingrid
 Grégoire
 Rosalie
 Raissa
 Bertrand
 Reine
 Nativité de N.-D.
 Alain
 Inès
 Adelphe
 Apollinaire
 Aimé
 Croix Glorieuse
 Roland
 Edith
 Renaud
 Nadège
 Emilie
 Davy
 Róisín 
 Maurice
 Constant
 Thècle
 Hermann
 Côme / Damien
 Vincent de Paul
 Vencelas
 Michel / Gabriel / Raphael
 Jérôme

October
 Thérèse de l'E.-J.
 Léger
 Gérard
 François d'Assise
 Fleur/ Chloé
 Bruno
 Serge
 Pélagie
 Denis
 Ghislain
 Firmin
 Wilfred
 Géraud
 Juste
 Thérèse d'Avila
 Eduige
 Baudouin
 Luc
 René
 Adeline
 Céline
 Salomé
 Jean de Capis.
 Florentin
 Crépin
 Dimitri
 Emeline
 Simon / Jude
 Narcisse
 Bienvenue
 Quentin / Wolfgang

November
 Toussaint
 Défunts
 Hubert
 Charles Borromée
 Sylvie
 Léonard
 Carine
 Geoffroy
 Théodore
 Léon
 Martin
 Christian
 Brice
 Sidonie
 Albert
 Margueritte
 Elisabeth
 Aude
 Mólly
 Edmond
 Prés. V. Marie
 Cécile
 Clément
 Flora
 Catherine Labouré
 Christ-Roi
 Séverin
 Jacques de la M.
 Saturnin
 André

December
Ruby
Georgie
Emily 
Jojo
Anna
Nicolas
Mia
Jasmine 
Ethan
George
Laura
Chantal
Alice
Rosanna
Ro
Poppy
Winnie
Charlotte
Aude
Jack 
Darcy
Henry
Safi
Delphine
Noël
Andre
Charles
Sofi
Amrit
Dylan 
Amanda

Saints days
France
French culture
French given names